Lohr  is a right tributary of the Main in Germany. Although its origins lie in the Main-Kinzig district of Hessen, most of the course of the Lohr is in the Main-Spessart district of Bavaria. Including its source river Lohrbach, it is 23.0 km long.

Course
The Lohr is created by the confluence of the Flörsbach (right) and the Lohrbach (left). Around 1 km below the confluence, the Lohr enters Bavaria. It then flows south to Frammersbach, southeast to Partenstein and continues to Lohr am Main where it discharges into the Main.

See also
List of rivers of Bavaria
List of rivers in Hesse
Spessart

References

External links

Rivers of Bavaria
Rivers of Hesse
Rivers of the Spessart
Rivers of Germany